The  is a German breed of domestic chicken. It is more than 400 years old, and is a rare breed.

History 

The Totleger derives from the traditional rural chickens of Westphalia, and was reared mainly in the area of the cities of Bielefeld and Herford. It is closely related to the Ostfriesische Möwe and to the Braekel. 

Although the German word  means "dead" and  means "(egg-)layer", the real meaning is another. Due to the considerable ability to produce eggs, the breed was called "Alltagsleger" ("every-day layer") or "Dauerleger". Under the influence of Low German the name changed into "Doutleijer". Later, from this Low German word, it developed into "Totleger". Derivation from "lays eggs until death" is not correct.

The Totleger was a popular breed until the arrival of more productive foreign breeds in the 1880s. By the time a breeders' association was formed in 1904, it had become largely an exhibition breed. Numbers remained low throughout the twentieth century, reaching a low point in the 1980s.

In 2013 the recorded population consisted of 301 cocks and 1353 hens; in 2016 it had fallen to 176 cocks and 798 hens, in the hands of 112 breeders.

Characteristics 

The Totleger is kept in two colours: gold-pencilled and silver-pencilled.

References

Chicken breeds
Chicken breeds originating in Germany
Animal breeds on the GEH Red List